Eduardo Martini (born January 11, 1979), is a Brazilian professional football (soccer) goalkeeper who plays for Brasil de Pelotas. He has previously played for Grêmio, Juventude, Avaí, Ponte Preta, Novo Hamburgo and Lajeadense.

Career 

Born on January 11, 1979, in Feliz, Rio Grande do Sul state, Eduardo Martini started his career in 1994, playing for Grêmio, of Porto Alegre, becoming a first-teamer in 2002, as a replacement for Danrlei. He played 18 Série A games for Grêmio, before joining Juventude in 2004, where he played 44 Campeonato Brasileiro Série A games. In 2006, he was transferred to Avaí, where, as of November 7, 2008, he played at least 100 games for the club. Eduardo Martini scored a goal for Avaí from his own box in a Série B game against Paraná Clube on August 22, 2008. Eduardo Martini joined Ponte Preta in December 2009 to play for the club in the 2010 season.

He joined Novo Hamburgo, on January 19, 2011, to play in the 2011 season. He moved to Lajeadense in 2013 and was close to sign with Icasa to play at the 2014 Campeonato Brasileiro Série B, but opted to join Série D side Brasil de Pelotas to stay closer to his family, achieving back-to-back promotions at his new club.

References 

1979 births
Living people
Brazilian footballers
Grêmio Foot-Ball Porto Alegrense players
Esporte Clube Juventude players
Avaí FC players
Associação Atlética Ponte Preta players
Esporte Clube Novo Hamburgo players
Clube Esportivo Lajeadense players
Association football goalkeepers
Campeonato Brasileiro Série A players
Campeonato Brasileiro Série B players
Grêmio Esportivo Brasil players